The Lukaskirche is a church in southern Dresden, Germany.

Consecrated in 1903, the Lutheran church was designed by Georg Weidenbach. It was heavily damaged in the bombing of Dresden, during which the spire was destroyed. After the war it was used as a recording studio.

References

Lutheran churches in Dresden
Recording studios in Germany
1903 establishments in Germany